William Henry Butler, also known as Billy Butler, is a British-Canadian musician, composer, sound designer, record producer and recording engineer. He is a recipient of several major music and sound production awards including an Emmy Award, two Leo Awards and a Juno Award.

References

External links

Juno Award winners
Primetime Emmy Award winners
Living people
Year of birth missing (living people)